The Clay County Historical Society Museum is located in Green Cove Springs, Clay County, Florida. It is located in a former train depot. Exhibits include railroad memorabilia, a country kitchen display and a country store display. It is operated by the Clay County Historical Society. The museum is located at 915 Walnut Street in the Historical Triangle which also includes the 1896 county jail and 1890 courthouse at Walnut Street and Ferris Street (Hwy 16).

References

Website
Clay County Historical Museum website

Museums in Clay County, Florida
Historical society museums in Florida